The Faro River is a  river that flows over the Nigeria–Cameroon border in Africa. Its source is on the Adamawa Plateau, which lies southeast of Ngaoundéré. A tributary of the Benue River, they meet on the border.

See also
Communes of Cameroon

References

Faro River
Rivers of Nigeria
Rivers of Cameroon